Low Tide is a 2019 American drama film, written and directed by Kevin McMullin. It stars Keean Johnson, Alex Neustaedter, Daniel Zolghadri, Kristine Froseth, Shea Whigham, and Jaeden Martell.

It had its world premiere at the Tribeca Film Festival on April 28, 2019 and was theatrically released in the United States on October 4, 2019, by A24.

Plot
At the New Jersey shore, three teenage boys spend summer roaming the boardwalk and town getting into small event trouble, but the discovery of a coin treasure sets the friends on an escalating course of suspicion and violence in an atmospheric thriller.

Cast
 Keean Johnson as Alan
 Jaeden Martell as Peter
 Alex Neustaedter as Red
 Daniel Zolghadri as Smitty
 Kristine Froseth as Mary
 Shea Whigham as Sergeant Kent
 James Paxton as Nate
 Danny Bolero as Javier

Release
It had its world premiere at the Tribeca Film Festival on April 28, 2019. A24 and DirecTV Cinema distributed the film. It was released in the United States through DirecTV Cinema on September 5, 2019, before being released in a limited release on October 4, 2019.

Critical reception
On Metacritic, the film holds a rating of 64 out of 100, based on 13 critics, indicating "generally favorable reviews".

References

External links
 

2019 films
2019 independent films
American drama films
American independent films
A24 (company) films
2010s English-language films
2010s American films